The 1968–69 Israel State Cup (Gvia HaMedina) was the 30th season of Israel's nationwide football cup competition and the 15th after the Israeli Declaration of Independence.

The competition started on 14 September 1968 with Liga Bet and Liga Gimel clubs playing the first round.  Liga Alef clubs joined the competition in the fourth round, played on 30 November 1968 and Liga Leumit entered on the sixth round, on 12 April 1969.

Hakoah Maccabi Ramat Gan and Maccabi Sha'arayim met in the final, both teams appearing in their first final (although Hakoah Tel Aviv, one of the clubs which were merged to form Hakoah Maccabi Ramat Gan, did appear in the 1935 final). Hakoah emerged the winner by a single goal to claim its first cup.

Results

Third Round
32 matches were due to be played on 26 October 1968. However, only 21 matches were played and the rest of the matches were given as walkover.

Fourth Round
Liga Alef clubs entered the competition on this round. As in previous seasons, The draw was set so that Liga Alef clubs wouldn't be drawn against each other.

Fifth Round
Most matches were played on 28 December 1968. The match between Hapoel Kiryat Haim and Hapoel Kiryat Shalom was postponed due to weather conditions.

Sixth Round
Liga Leumit clubs entered the competition in this round. The IFA arranged the draw so each Liga Leumit clubs wouldn't be drawn to play each other.

Seventh Round

Quarter-finals

Semi-finals

Final

Notes

References
100 Years of Football 1906-2006, Elisha Shohat (Israel), 2006

External links
 Israel Football Association website

Israel State Cup
State Cup
Israel State Cup seasons